Natisha Naresha John (born 6 May 2000) is a Trinidadian footballer who plays as a defender. She has been a member of the Trinidad and Tobago women's national team.

International career
John represented Trinidad and Tobago at the 2016 CONCACAF Women's U-17 Championship qualification and the 2018 CONCACAF Women's U-20 Championship. At senior level, she capped during the 2018 Central American and Caribbean Games and the 2018 CONCACAF Women's Championship qualification.

References

2000 births
Living people
Women's association football defenders
Trinidad and Tobago women's footballers
People from Tunapuna–Piarco
Trinidad and Tobago women's international footballers
Competitors at the 2018 Central American and Caribbean Games
Young Harris Mountain Lions women's soccer players
Trinidad and Tobago expatriate women's footballers
Trinidad and Tobago expatriate sportspeople in the United States
Expatriate women's soccer players in the United States